Raymond Thomas Kinsella (January 27, 1911 – April 29, 1996) was a Canadian professional ice hockey defenceman for who played 14 games in the National Hockey League with the Ottawa Senators during the 1930–31 season. The rest of his career, which lasted from 1928 to 1938, was spent in various minor leagues. He was born in Ottawa, Ontario, Canada.

Playing career
Kinsella was playing in the Ottawa City Senior Hockey League when the Senators signed him as a free agent in 1931. Kinsella played the rest of the 1930–31 season for the Ottawa Senators. It was his only year in the NHL. Starting in the following season, he played three seasons in the Can-Am Hockey League, finishing his professional career with the AHA Tulsa Oilers in 1934–35. When the Ottawa Senators NHL franchise moved to St. Louis, the owners set up the Ottawa Senators senior men's amateur team. After his professional career ended, Kinsella returned to Ottawa and played for the senior Senators.

After hockey
Kinsella, one of three surviving Ottawa Senators in 1992, was part of the opening night ceremonies in 1992 for the current Ottawa Senators. Ray's brothers  Gerry and Ollie Kinsella also played ice hockey.

Career statistics

Regular season and playoffs

External links
 

1911 births
1996 deaths
Canadian ice hockey defencemen
Ice hockey people from Ottawa
London Tecumsehs players
New Haven Eagles players
Ottawa Senators (1917) players
Ottawa Senators (original) players
Philadelphia Arrows players
Quebec Castors players
Tulsa Oilers (AHA) players